The 2014 Premier Bank Bangladesh Championship League started on 26 February 2014 where 7 clubs competed with each other.

Teams and locations

The following 7 clubs competed in the Bangladesh Championship League during the 2014 season.

 Agrani Bank SC, Dhaka
 Arambagh Krira Sangha, Dhaka
 Badda Jagarani Sangsad, Dhaka
 Farashganj SC, Dhaka
 Rahmatganj MFS, Dhaka
 Victoria SC, Dhaka
 Wari Club, Dhaka

The venues for this season were-
 Bangabandhu National Stadium, Dhaka
 Bir Sherestha Shaheed Shipahi Mostafa Kamal Stadium, Dhaka

Standings

References

2012
2
Bangladesh
Bangladesh